State Route 612 (SR 612) is a state highway in Clark County, Nevada.

Route description

State Route 612 begins at the intersection of Nellis Boulevard and Tropicana Avenue (SR 593) on the border of unincorporated communities of Paradise and Whitney. From there, the route heads north along Nellis Boulevard north as it travels through the Las Vegas area, entering the unincorporated town of Sunrise Manor and briefly forming the easternmost border of the city of Las Vegas. The state highway comes to an end at the intersection of Nellis Boulevard and Las Vegas Boulevard (SR 604) near Nellis Air Force Base.

SR 612, as Nellis Boulevard, passes by many retail businesses as well as residential neighborhoods. It is one of the major north–south roadways in Sunrise Manor.

History
SR 612 was established in the 1976 renumbering of Nevada's state highways. The route was designated on July 1, 1976.

Major intersections

Notes:

Public transport
RTC Transit Route 115 functions on this road.

See also

References

612
Streets in the Las Vegas Valley